Rajahmundry Rural mandal, officially known as Rajamahendravaram Rural mandal, is one of the 19 mandals in East Godavari district of the state of Andhra Pradesh, India. The mandal is bounded by Seethanagaram mandal, Korukonda mandal, Rajanagaram mandal, Kadiam mandal and Atreyapuram mandal.

Demographics 

 census, the mandal had a population of 166,973. The total population constitute, 82,544 males and 84,429 females —a sex ratio of 1023 females per 1000 males. 17,423 children are in the age group of 0–6 years, of which 8,809 are boys and 8,614 are girls —a ratio of 978 per 1000. The average literacy rate stands at 76.49% with 114,391 literates.

Governance 

Rajahmundry (rural) mandal is a part of "Greater Rajamahendravaram Municipal Corporation (GRMC)".

The list of villages under its jurisdiction include:

 Bommuru
 Dowleswaram
 Hukumpeta
 Katheru
 Kolamuru
 Morampudi
 Rajavolu
 Torredu

References

Mandals in East Godavari district